Romina Gaetani (born April 15, 1977) is an Argentine actress, TV host and singer.

Biography
Romina Gaetani was born on April 15, 1977 in Buenos Aires, Argentina. Her mother is Maria Flamini and her father was the producer Carlos Hugo Gaetani, who died in 2014. She has also a brother named Leonardo who is an architect. From an early age Romina demonstrated her interest in acting, so she enrolled herself in the theater institute Andamio 90, in the acting career, during four years. She studied her secondary years in the institute of Santa Ana de Villa Ballester, in the north zone of the Gran Buenos Aires.

Career
Her first role on television was in the unitary Verdad consecuencia in the year 1998. Her acting debut in the theater was in the musical comedy El rey David in the role of Betsabé and directed by the director Pepe Cibrián Campoy, in the year 1998. That same year she joined the cast of the telenovela Verano del '98, in the role of Carla. In the year 2000 her first leading role came in the sixth season of Chiquititas in the role of Luz Linares. She participated in the soundtrack and theatrical season of the cycle in Teatro Gran Rex. The following year she was counterfigure of Facundo Arana and Gianella Neyra in the Telefe telenovela, Yago, pasión morena. She continued acting in Mil millones  and in the year 2003 she was the protagonist of the telenovela of Pol-Ka Soy gitano. Along with Dady Brieva starred  Los secretos de papá since the second half of 2004. Then she acted in the Argentine version of Amas de casa desesperadas. In the time period of 2007–2008 she traveled to México to record the television series Mientras haya vida where she played Romina Sáenz, the antagonist of the telenovela next to Saúl Lizazo and Andrés Palacios. In theater she acted in works as Seda, Revista nacional and Cinco mujeres con el mismo vestido. In the year 2008 she starred in the telenovela of Telefe Don Juan y su bella dama, along with Joaquín Furriel. In the years 2009 and 2010 she starred Botineras along with Nicolás Cabré and Isabel Macedo. In 2011 she returned to Pol-Ka to star in Herederos de una venganza, alongside Luciano Castro. The following year she participate in Lobo playing Miranda. Between the years 2012 and 2013 she acted in the works Recordando con ira and Triste golondrina macho, and on television she participated in the unitary Televisión por la justicia for which she was nominated for the Emmy Awards for Best Actress. Until March 9, 2015 she starred the telenovela  Noche y día along with Facundo Arana, but she had to resign due to health problems. In 2018 she has a participation in novel Simona playing Siena Velasco the girlfriend of Dr. Guerrico.

Television

Theater

Movies

Discography

TV programs

Awards

References

External links
 

Actresses from Buenos Aires
21st-century Argentine actresses
1977 births
Living people